The wheelchair curling competition of the 2022 Winter Paralympics was held from 5 to 12 March 2022 at the Beijing National Aquatics Centre in Beijing, China.

Medalists

Qualification
Qualification for the 2022 Paralympics was based on rankings in the 2019, 2020, and 2021 World Wheelchair Curling Championships. The qualification points are allotted based on the nations' final rankings at the World Championships. The points are distributed as shown in the table below. The eleven countries with the most points were to qualify for the Beijing Games, while the twelfth slot was reserved for the host country, China. Because the Chinese team placed within the top eleven point-scorers, the twelfth slot was given to the twelfth-ranked team, Estonia.

Rankings

Notes
 After qualifying, athletes representing the RPC were denied entry into the 2022 Winter Paralympics due to the 2022 Russian invasion of Ukraine.
 Scotland, England and Wales all compete separately (Northern Ireland competes as part of a team from the island of Ireland) at the World Wheelchair Curling Championship. Under an agreement between the curling federations of those three home nations, only qualification points earned by Scotland count toward the point total for Great Britain.

Teams
The teams are listed as follows:

Round-robin standings
Final round-robin standings

Round-robin results
All draw times are listed in China Standard Time (UTC+08:00).

Draw 1
Saturday, March 5, 14:35

Draw 2
Saturday, March 5, 19:35

Draw 3
Sunday, March 6, 9:35

Draw 4
Sunday, March 6, 14:35

Draw 5
Sunday, March 6, 19:35

Draw 6
Monday, March 7, 9:35

Draw 7
Monday, March 7, 14:35

Draw 8
Monday, March 7, 19:35

Draw 9
Tuesday, March 8, 9:35

Draw 10
Tuesday, March 8, 14:35

Draw 11
Tuesday, March 8, 19:35

Draw 12
Wednesday, March 9, 9:35

Draw 13
Wednesday, March 9, 14:35

Draw 14
Wednesday, March 9, 19:35

Draw 15
Thursday, March 10, 9:35

Draw 16
Thursday, March 10, 14:35

Draw 17
Thursday, March 10, 19:35

Playoffs

Semifinals
Friday, March 11, 14:35

Bronze medal game
Friday, March 11, 19:35

Gold medal game
Saturday, March 12, 14:35

Final standings
The final standings are:

References

External links
 
 

2022
2022 Winter Paralympics events
Winter Paralympics
International curling competitions hosted by China